Deh-e Dasht is a village in Hudian Rural District, in the Central District of Dalgan County, Sistan and Baluchestan Province, Iran. At the 2006 census, its population was 118, in 29 families.

References 

Populated places in Dalgan County